The Leata was an automobile manufactured by Stinebaugh Manufacturing Inc, founded by Donald E. Stinebaugh (1916-1992) with his son Leonard D. "Sonny" Stinebaugh (1946-2001) in Post Falls, Idaho.

The car sold for $2895, and Stinebaugh claimed to have manufactured 20 by the end of March 1975. The company employed 15 workers, and Stinebaugh claimed that he was looking to produce between 1,000 and 1,500 cars a year.

In 1977, a more modern-looking vehicle was launched, called the Cabalero.
Stinebaugh named the car after his wife Hilda (Erickson) Stinebaugh, giving the car her nickname, Leata — a misunderstanding of litt, Norwegian for "little."

The Cabalero was powered by a 4-cylinder General Motors LY-5 engine, and featured power windows, power seat and cruise control — as well as baroque styling with custom fibreglass body panels, round headlights in square bezels, a rectangular "classic" grille, and heavily styled mudguards; Two models were made - a pickup or hatchback.

Just 97 Leatas were made before the company closed down in late 1977.

References

Car manufacturers of the United States
Defunct motor vehicle manufacturers of the United States
Luxury motor vehicle manufacturers
Vehicle manufacturing companies established in 1975
Vehicle manufacturing companies disestablished in 1977